St Oscar Romero Catholic School (formerly Chatsmore Catholic High School; formerly Blessed Robert Southwell High School) is a coeducational Roman Catholic secondary school located in the Goring-by-Sea area of Worthing, West Sussex, England.

It is a voluntary aided school administered by West Sussex County Council and the Roman Catholic Diocese of Arundel and Brighton. The school is named after Archbishop Óscar Romero.

Facilities 
St Oscar Romero Catholic School has a reception, a canteen, the Learning Resource Centre (LRC - the library), a food technology room, two IT suites, a wood tech room, graphics rooms, a drama department, a dance studio, sports hall, tennis courts, football pitch and a field, music suite, rock climbing wall and the recently built amphitheatre.

Controversy
In 2008 the school banned the drink Red Bull as it believed that the drink had an adverse effect on the behaviour of the pupils.

Notable former pupils 
 Brenock O'Connor – actor, best known for his role as Olly in the Game of Thrones series
 Leo Sayer - singer

References

External links
OFSTED Report
Official site

Secondary schools in West Sussex
Buildings and structures in Worthing
Catholic secondary schools in the Diocese of Arundel and Brighton
Voluntary aided schools in England
Óscar Arnulfo Romero
Educational institutions established in 1957
1957 establishments in England